Upwords (at one time branded as Scrabble Upwords in the United States and Canada; and  Topwords, Crucimaster, Betutorony, Palabras Arriba and Stapelwoord in other countries) is a board game invented by Elliot Rudell and originally published by the Milton Bradley Company, now a division of Hasbro. Worldwide  marketing rights to Upwords have been licensed to Spin Master Inc. by Rudell Design, LLC as of 2018. Upwords is similar to Scrabble or Words With Friends, in that players build words using letter tiles on a gridded gameboard. The point of difference is that in Upwords letters can be stacked on top of other letters already on the gameboard to create new words. The higher the stack of letters, the more points are scored. This typically makes words built in later turns of the game more valuable than earlier words, increasing play intensity and adding a level of strategy unique to Upwords. The memorization of two-letter words is considered a useful skill in this game.

Unlike Scrabble, which is manufactured in the U.S. and Canada by Hasbro and elsewhere in the world by Mattel, Upwords is solely controlled by Spin Master. As of August 2019 the game is being relaunched and will be available in other countries around the world. In the past and while under license from Hasbro, Upwords was available in about twenty languages. There have been national tournaments played in Hungary and Turkey.

Gameplay
Each player draws a tile; the one with the letter nearest to A will be the first to play. The tiles are returned to the draw pile.

Each player draws seven tiles to start the game. The first player forms a word with one or more of their tiles. The word must cover one or more of the four central squares. The player then draws more tiles to replace those played. Play continues to the left.

Subsequent players may put tiles on the board adjacent to and/or on top of the tiles already played, as long as all words formed are found in the dictionary being used and the rules below are followed. All words must read horizontally from left to right, or vertically from top to bottom.

All tiles played on a turn must form part of one continuous straight line of tiles across or down.

For example, if the word CATER is on the board, a player could put a B and E in front of CATER and then put an L on top of the C and a D on top of the R to build BELATED. 

Restrictions on words are as follows:

 No words that are always capitalized
 No hyphenated words
 No words requiring an apostrophe
 No abbreviations or symbols
 No prefixes or suffixes which cannot stand alone
 No foreign words unless they are in the dictionary
 The 2008 edition included a new rule: Players may not pluralize a word simply by adding an S at its end. However, such a play is allowed if the S is part of another complete word that is played onto the board in the same turn. This rule is intended to prevent players from capitalizing on one another's words without changing them or playing new ones.

Restrictions on stacking tiles are as follows:

 No stack may be more than five tiles high.
 No tile may be stacked directly onto a duplicate of itself.
 At least one tile or stack must be left unchanged; a player may not cover every letter in a word on a single turn.

A player may choose to pass at any time, or discard one tile and draw a replacement instead of playing.

Once the draw pile is exhausted, the game ends when any player runs out of tiles, or every player passes in a single round.

Scoring
Any word with no stacked letters scores two points per tile, while a word containing stacked letters scores one point for every tile it contains. In the CATER/BELATED example above, CATER would score 10 points, while BELATED would score nine. Two bonus points are awarded for using the "Qu" tile in a one-level word, and 20 for using all seven tiles in one turn.

Players lose five points for every unused tile they hold at the end of the game.

History
Originally, Upwords was played on an 8×8 square board, with 64 letter tiles.  Hasbro Europe later expanded the gameboard to a 10×10 matrix and 100 tiles, to accommodate the longer words frequently used in foreign languages such as German and Dutch. The 10×10 matrix is currently employed in worldwide versions of the game. The board is purposely smaller (has fewer tile positions) than Scrabble to encourage and even force the stacking up of letters upon letters. It does not have special squares such as "triple word scores" and "double letter scores" that require additional scoring calculations.

Letter Distribution

The letter distribution of the 8 by 8 version of Upwords is as follows:

64 tiles:

1 of each: F, J, K, Qu, V, W, X, Z

2 of each: B, C, G, H, R, Y

3 of each: D, L, M, N, P, S, U

4 of each: I, O, T

5 of each: A

6 of each: E

The letter distribution of the 10 by 10 version of Upwords is as follows:

100 tiles:

1 of each: J, Qu, V, X, Z

2 of each: K, W, Y

3 of each: B, F, G, H, P

4 of each: C

5 of each: D, L, M, N, R, T, U

6 of each: S

7 of each: A, I, O

8 of each: E

Other versions
In the early 1990s, Hasbro licensed electronic marketing rights to Microsoft, briefly making the game available electronically. Microsoft no longer has rights to Upwords.

In 2013, Upwords was developed by indie software developers Lonely Star Software, under license from Hasbro. , Lonely Star Software continues to offer Upwords for smartphone and tablet play, under direct license from Rudell Design. The game was first released as an app for iOS devices. On 27 March 2014, Lonely Star released the app for Android platform devices.

Besides an updated version of Upwords that offers a 10x10 grid and 100 tiles, Upwords remains available in its "classic" 8×8 version, distributed by Winning Moves.

In late 2021 Elliot Rudell the inventor of original UPWORDS developed a second version, called HURRY UPWORDS. Developed as an app by Lonely Star Software, HURRY UPWORDS was released in early 2022. HURRY UPWORDS pits one player against the other with each player receiving the identical random letter mix in the same order of distribution. Players each play a 3-minute game challenge on their own gameboard, after which high score determines the winner of the competition.

Reviews
Jeux & Stratégie #32 (as "Optimots")

References

Board games introduced in 1981
Scrabble variants